The mountain hare (Lepus timidus), also known as blue hare, tundra hare, variable hare, white hare, snow hare, alpine hare, and Irish hare, is a Palearctic hare that is largely adapted to polar and mountainous habitats.

Evolution
The mountain hare arose during the Late Pleistocene; there is evidence that its range expanded during glaciations into southern Europe, with populations of Iberian hare (Lepus granatensis), European hare (L. europaeus) and broom hare (L. castroviejoi) in northern Iberia harboring mitochondrial haplotypes from the mountain hare.
During the Late Pleistocene to Early Holocene, populations of mountain hare in Russia grew at least 10% larger than any living population today. This population has been classified as a distinct species Lepus tanaiticus, but is now generally considered a prehistoric morphotype of the living mountain hare.

Distribution
This species is distributed from Fennoscandia to eastern Siberia; in addition, isolated mountain populations occur in the Alps, Scotland, the Baltics, northeastern Poland, and Hokkaidō. In Ireland, the  Irish hare (L. t. hibernicus) lives on lowland pastures, coastal grasslands, and salt marshes, not just in the mountains. The mountain hare has also been introduced to Iceland, Shetland, Orkney, the Isle of Man, the Peak District, Svalbard, Kerguelen Islands, Crozet Islands, and the Faroe Islands. In the Alps, the mountain hare lives at elevations from 700 to 3800 m, depending on geographic region and season.

Description

The mountain hare is a large species, though it is slightly smaller than the European hare. They can live for up to 12 years. In summer, for all populations of mountain hares, the coat is various shades of brown. In preparation for winter most populations moult into a white (or largely white) pelage. The tail remains completely white all year round, distinguishing the mountain hare from the European hare (Lepus europaeus), which has a black upper side to the tail. The subspecies Lepus timidus hibernicus (the Irish mountain hare) is smaller in size and stays brown all year. The Irish hare may also have a "golden" variation, particularly those found on Rathlin Island.

In the Faroe Islands, mountain hares turn grey in the winter instead of white. The winter-grey colour may be caused by downregulation of the agouti hair cycle isoform in the autumn moult.

Behaviour 

The diet of the mountain hare varies from region to region. It seems to be somewhat dependent on the particular habitat in which the population under study lives. For example, in northern Scandinavia, where snow may blanket the ground for many months, the hares may feed on twigs and bark. In areas where snowfall is rare, such as Ireland, grass may form the bulk of the diet. Given a choice, mountain hares in Scotland and Ireland seem to prefer grazing (feeding on grasses). For mountain hares on a coastal grassland environment in Ireland, grasses constituted over 90% of their diet. This was higher than the percentage of grass in the diet of the European rabbit (Oryctolagus cuniculus) that inhabited the same environment. The mountain hare is regionally the favourite prey of the golden eagle and may additionally be preyed on by Eurasian eagle-owls and red foxes. Stoats may prey on young hares.

In southern parts of Finland, Norway, and Sweden, the mountain hare and the European hare compete for habitat. The European hare, being larger, is usually able to drive away the mountain hare, but is less adapted for living in snowy regions; its feet are smaller and its winter fur is a mixture of white and brown. While this winter fur is actually a very good camouflage in the coastal regions of Finland where the snow covers the shrubs only a short time, the mountain hare is better adapted for the snowier conditions of the inland areas. The two may occasionally cross.

The Arctic hare (Lepus arcticus) was once considered a subspecies of the mountain hare, but it is now regarded as a separate species. Similarly, some scientists believe that the Irish hare should be regarded as a separate species. Fifteen subspecies are currently recognised.

Human impact 
In the European Alps, the mountain hare lives at elevations from 700 to 3800 m, depending on biographic region and season. The development of alpine winter tourism has increased rapidly since the last few decades of the 20th century, resulting in expansion of ski resorts, growing visitor numbers, and a huge increase in all forms of snow sport activities. A 2013 study looking at stress events and the response of mountain hares to disturbance concluded that those hares living in areas of high winter recreational activities showed changes in physiology and behaviour that demanded additional energy input at a time when access to food resources is restricted by snow. It recommended ensuring that forests inhabited by mountain hares were kept free of tourist development, and that new skiing areas should be avoided in mountain hare habitat, and that existing sites should not be expanded.

In August 2016, the Scottish animal welfare charity OneKind launched a campaign on behalf of the mountain hare, as a way of raising awareness of mountain hare culls taking place across the country and in garnering public support for the issue. Mountain hares are routinely shot in the Scottish Highlands both as part of paid hunting "tours" and by gamekeepers managing red grouse populations (who believe that mountain hares can be vectors of diseases that affect the birds). Much of this activity is secretive, but investigations have revealed that tens of thousands of hares are being culled every year. The campaign, which urges people to proclaim, "We Care For The Mountain Hare", will culminate with the charity urging the Scottish government to legislate against commercial hunting and culling of the iconic Scottish species. The campaign has revealed widespread public support for a ban on hare hunting in Scotland. On May 17, 2020, MSPs voted to ban the unlicensed culling of mountain hares and grant them protected species status within Scotland after a petition started by Green MSP Alison Johnstone gathered over 22,000 signatures.

In 2021, the People's Trust for Endangered Species funded a survey of mountain hare populations in the UK's Peak District after concerns about the viability of the isolated population, believed to be as low as 2,500. The trust believes climate change is a threat to long-term survival of the Peak District population, which was introduced to the area in the 1870s.

References

External links 

Irish Hare Initiative

Lepus
Mammals of Asia
Mammals of Europe
Mammals of China
Mammals of Japan
Mammals of Central Asia
Mammals of Russia
Arctic land animals
Mammals described in 1758
Taxa named by Carl Linnaeus
National symbols of the Republic of Ireland
Mammals of Mongolia